Frolova may refer to one of the following:

People
Anna Frolova (born 2005), Russian single skater
Elena Frolova, singer, composer and poet
Inna Frolova, a rower from Ukraine, an Olympic medalist
Lyudmila Frolova, a field hockey player and Olympic medalist
Nina Frolova, a Soviet rowing cox
Olga Frolova, a linguist
Slava Frolova, a Ukrainian TV presenter
Tamara Frolova, a Russian politician

Other
6165 Frolova, an asteroid